A kris is an asymmetrical dagger indigenous to Java, Indonesia.

Kris or KRIS may also refer to:

Names 
 Kris Kringle, another name for Santa Claus
 Kris (name), a unisex given name and a surname
 Kris Trindl (born 1987), American DJ, best known for being part of the EDM group Krewella
 Kris Wu, stage name of Wu Yifan (born 1990), Canadian-Chinese actor, singer-songwriter, and former member of Exo
 Kristina Dörfer (born 1984), German singer and actress known by the stage name Kris

Media 
 Kris (TV series) or Kris Jenner Show, a short-lived U.S. talk show hosted by Kris Jenner
 Kris or The Kris Aquino Show, a Philippine talk show hosted by Kris Aquino
 Kris TV, a Philippine morning lifestyle talk show hosted by Kris Aquino
 KRIS-TV, an NBC affiliate in South Texas, U.S.
 KRIS-DT2, an affiliate subchannel of KRIS-TV
 Crisis (1946 film) (Kris), a Swedish film directed by Ingmar Bergman
 Kris (magazine), a defunct Swedish magazine

Other uses 
Kris (horse) (1976–2004), a racehorse and sire
 Kris (chimpanzee) (1982–2010), one-time alpha male of the group studied by Dr. Jane Goodall
 Kris (Romani court), a traditional court for conflict resolution
Kris, the protagonist in the video game Deltarune

See also
 
 Cris (disambiguation)
 Criss
 Chris
 Christine (name), including Kristine
 Christopher (name), including Kristoffer and Kristopher
 Kristjan